Ivanovka is a rural locality (a selo) in Gubkinsky District, Belgorod Oblast, Russia. The population was 54 as of 2010. There are 6 streets.

Geography 
Ivanovka is located 22 km northwest of Gubkin (the district's administrative centre) by road. Panki is the nearest rural locality.

References 

Rural localities in Gubkinsky District